The  is a river in north-west Wales and the second major tributary of the River Conwy. It is about 10 miles or 16 km long, and flows in a generally easterly direction.

It initially flows in a north-easterly direction towards , where  joins it, then flows under the Roman Bridge and past , where  joins it.

References

Rivers of Conwy County Borough
Rivers of Snowdonia